Lorilee Craker (born 1968) is a writer in Michigan, United States. She grew up in Winnipeg, Manitoba, Canada. She has three children. She advocates participation in community-supported agriculture and shopping at farmers' markets. She is an entertainment writer for MLive. Craker co-authored Lynne Spears' memoir Through the Storm. Craker and Spears appeared together at the 20th annual MOPS International convention in Grapevine, Texas in 2008. Craker co-authored My Journey to Heaven: What I Saw and How It Changed My Life with Marv Besteman, who died before the book was published. In a 2011 Time article, Zac Bissonnette writes that Craker "might be the most versatile journalist in America".

References

Bibliography

1968 births
Living people
20th-century American non-fiction writers
20th-century American women writers
20th-century Canadian non-fiction writers
20th-century Canadian women writers
20th-century evangelicals
21st-century American non-fiction writers
21st-century American women writers
21st-century Canadian non-fiction writers
21st-century Canadian women writers
21st-century evangelicals
American evangelicals
American members of the Christian Reformed Church in North America
American women non-fiction writers
Canadian emigrants to the United States
Canadian evangelicals
Canadian women non-fiction writers
Evangelical writers
Journalists from Manitoba
Journalists from Michigan
Writers from Winnipeg